Adam Pompey (born 22 August 1998) is a New Zealand professional rugby league footballer who plays as a  and er for the New Zealand Warriors in the National Rugby League (NRL).

Background
Pompey was born in Auckland, New Zealand. He attended Wesley College in Auckland. 

He played in the NRL Under-20s for the Sydney Roosters and, while under contract there, played also for the Roosters' feeder club, the Wyong Roos.

Career

2019
Pompey made his first grade debut for the Warriors against the Cronulla-Sutherland Sharks in round 18 of the 2019 NRL season. In round 24 2019, Pompey scored his first NRL try in the Warriors 10-31 loss to the South Sydney Rabbitohs at Mt Smart Stadium in Auckland.

2020
In round 16 of the 2020 NRL season, Pompey scored two tries in a 36-6 victory over Newcastle at Scully Park in Tamworth.

2021
In round 3 of the 2021 NRL season, Pompey scored the match winning try in a 34-31 win over the Canberra Raiders.

2022
Pompey made a total of 19 appearances for the New Zealand club in the 2022 NRL season as they finished 15th on the table.

References

External links
New Zealand Warriors profile

1998 births
Living people
New Zealand Māori rugby league players
New Zealand rugby league players
New Zealand Warriors players
Rugby league centres
Rugby league players from Auckland
Rugby league wingers